Ivan Vladimirovich Solovyov (born 29 March 1993) is a Russian professional football player. He plays in Uzbekistan for FC Nasaf.

Club career
On 31 October 2012, he played his first game for the main Dynamo Moscow squad, setting up a winning goal in a 2-1 victory over FC Khimki in the 2012–13 Russian Cup Round of 16 game.

He made his debut in the Russian Premier League on 4 November 2012 for FC Dynamo Moscow in a game against FC Krasnodar. On the next matchday on 10 November 2012, he started the game for the first time in a match against FC Alania Vladikavkaz.

He joined FC Zenit on 1 August 2013, after his contract with Dynamo ended.

Honours
Zenit Saint Petersburg
Russian Football Premier League: 2014–15

References

External links

 

1993 births
Living people
Sportspeople from Kaluga
Russian footballers
Russia youth international footballers
Russia under-21 international footballers
Association football midfielders
FC Dynamo Moscow players
FC Amkar Perm players
FC Zenit Saint Petersburg players
FC Lahti players
FC Fakel Voronezh players
FC Dynamo Saint Petersburg players
PFC Sochi players
Navbahor Namangan players
Russian expatriate footballers
Expatriate footballers in Finland
Expatriate footballers in Uzbekistan
Russian Premier League players
FC Zenit-2 Saint Petersburg players